A river valley is a valley formed by flowing water.

River valley civilization

Geography
River Valley, Singapore
River Valley Single Member Constituency
River Valley High School, Singapore
River Valley, Nipissing District, Ontario

Schools
River Valley Community College (RVCC), a community college with campuses in Claremont, Keene, and Lebanon, New Hampshire.
River Valley High School (Bidwell, Ohio)
River Valley High School (Yuba City, California)

See also
River Valley Conference (disambiguation)
Valley River (disambiguation)
River (disambiguation)
Valley (disambiguation)